Punceres is one of the 13 municipalities of the state of Monagas, Venezuela. The municipality's capital is Quiriquire.

Geography 
Punceres  is located to the north of Monagas State. Presents a vegetation of dry tropical forest and another of humid tropical forest, has an annual average temperature of 26.4 ° C and rainfall of 1,935 mm (annual average).

Government

Mayors 
 Jesus Mata. (2008—2013) PSUV.
 Magalys Villalba. (2013—2017) PSUV.

Municipalities of Monagas